Sic 'Em is a command used by dog handlers
Sic 'Em, Towser, a movie by Harold Lloyd
Sic 'Em Friday, MTV2 television feature 
Sic 'em Bears, a hand gesture
"Sic Em", 2016 song by Thugli